Mentha darvasica is a mint species within the genus Mentha, native to Darvaz, Tajikistan. The species was recorded by Russian botanist Antonina Borissova in 1954.

Taxonomy
While it is accepted as a distinct species by authorities such as Plants of the World Online, some authors have treated Mentha darvasica as a synonym of Mentha longifolia.

Description
A perennial species, Mentha darvasica grows stems 20–30 centimeters long, and propagates via rhizomes. It produces ovate to oblong-ovate leaves of 1 to 3 centimeters.

Use
Mentha darvasica has been reported to have anthelmintic (antiparasitic) characteristics. It has been used against the nematodes Bunostomum, Chabertia ovina and Trichostrongylidae.

Notes

References

 
 
 
 

darvasica
Flora of Tajikistan
Plants described in 1954